SN 2005df was a Type Ia supernova in the barred spiral galaxy NGC 1559, which is located in the southern constellation of Reticulum. The event was discovered in Australia by Robert Evans on the early morning of August 5, 2005 with a 13.8 magnitude, and was confirmed by A. Gilmore on August 6. The supernova was classified as Type Ia by M. Salvo and associates. The supernova luminosity appeared unreddened by dust from its host galaxy.

The progenitor was a carbon-oxygen white dwarf close to the Chandrasekhar limit, making a merger scenario unlikely. Modelling of the explosion shows a low central density for a hydrogen accretion scenario, suggesting the donating companion was a helium star or a tidally-disrupted white dwarf. Alternatively, the progenitor may have undergone some form of central mixing.

References

External links
 Light curves and spectra on the Open Supernova Catalog
 Color photographs of SN 2005df
 Brightness measures for SN 2005df

Supernovae
Reticulum (constellation)
20050804
2005 in science